South Korea competed at the 2019 Winter Deaflympics held between 12 and 21 December 2019 in Province of Sondrio in Northern Italy. The country won one bronze medal and the country finished in 16th place in the medal table.

Medalists

Curling 

South Korea won the bronze medal in the women's curling tournament.

References 

Winter Deaflympics
Nations at the 2019 Winter Deaflympics